A radial basis function (RBF) is a real-valued function  whose value depends only on the distance between the input and some fixed point, either the origin, so that , or some other fixed point , called a center, so that . Any function  that satisfies the property  is a radial function. The distance is usually Euclidean distance, although other metrics are sometimes used. They are often used as a collection  which forms a basis for some function space of interest, hence the name.

Sums of radial basis functions are typically used to approximate given functions. This approximation process can also be interpreted as a simple kind of neural network; this was the context in which they were originally applied to machine learning, in work by David Broomhead and David Lowe in 1988, which stemmed from Michael J. D. Powell's seminal research from 1977.
RBFs are also used as a kernel in support vector classification. The technique has proven effective and flexible enough that radial basis functions are now applied in a variety of engineering applications.

Definition 
A radial function is a function . A Radial function and the associated radial kernels are said to be radial basis functions if, for any set of nodes

Examples 
Commonly used types of radial basis functions include (writing  and using  to indicate a shape parameter that can be used to scale the input of the radial kernel):

Approximation

Radial basis functions are typically used to build up function approximations of the form

where the approximating function  is represented as a sum of  radial basis functions, each associated with a different center , and weighted by an appropriate coefficient  The weights  can be estimated using the matrix methods of linear least squares, because the approximating function is linear in the weights .

Approximation schemes of this kind have been particularly used in time series prediction and control of nonlinear systems exhibiting sufficiently simple chaotic behaviour and 3D reconstruction in computer graphics (for example, hierarchical RBF and Pose Space Deformation).

RBF Network

The sum

can also be interpreted as a rather simple single-layer type of artificial neural network called a radial basis function network, with the radial basis functions taking on the role of the activation functions of the network.  It can be shown that any continuous function on a compact interval can in principle be interpolated with arbitrary accuracy by a sum of this form, if a sufficiently large number  of radial basis functions is used. 

The approximant  is differentiable with respect to the weights . The weights could thus be learned using any of the standard iterative methods for neural networks.

Using radial basis functions in this manner yields a reasonable interpolation approach provided that the fitting set has been chosen such that it covers the entire range systematically (equidistant data points are ideal). However, without a polynomial term that is orthogonal to the radial basis functions, estimates outside the fitting set tend to perform poorly.

RBFs for PDEs 

Radial basis functions are used to approximate functions and so can be used to discretize and numerically solve Partial Differential Equations (PDEs). This was first done in 1990 by E. J. Kansa who developed the first RBF based numerical method. It is called the Kansa method and was used to solve the elliptic Poisson equation and the linear advection-diffusion equation. The function values at points  in the domain are approximated by the linear combination of RBFs:

The derivatives are approximated as such:

where  are the number of points in the discretized domain,  the dimension of the domain and  the scalar coefficients that are unchanged by the differential operator.

Different numerical methods based on Radial Basis Functions were developed thereafter. Some methods are the RBF-FD method, the RBF-QR method and the RBF-PUM method.

See also
 Matérn covariance function
 Radial basis function interpolation
 Kansa method

References

Further reading 

 
 
 Sirayanone, S., 1988, Comparative studies of kriging, multiquadric-biharmonic, and other methods for solving mineral resource problems, PhD. Dissertation, Dept. of Earth Sciences, Iowa State University, Ames, Iowa.
 

Artificial neural networks
Interpolation
Numerical analysis